Cynoglossus durbanensis, commonly known as the Durban tonguesole is a species of tonguefish. It is commonly found in the western Indian Ocean off the coast of Kenya, Madagascar, Mozambique and South Africa.

References
Fishbase

Cynoglossidae
Fish described in 1921